Dance Flick is a 2009 American musical comedy film directed by Damien Dante Wayans in his directorial debut and written by and starring many members of the Wayans family. The film was set for release in the United States on February 6, 2009, and changed to May 22, 2009.

Plot
Suburban girl Megan White (Shoshana Bush) gets into a series of misadventures when she moves to the inner-city and pursues dance. A nerdy street boy named Thomas Uncles (Damon Wayans Jr.) is passionate about street dancing, but he is stuck working for a gang lord (David Alan Grier).

Megan later befriends Thomas' ghetto sister Charity (Essence Atkins) who has a baby and poor parenting skills. Charity has her own issues dealing with her dimwitted "baby daddy" (Shawn Wayans) who also is a bad parent. Once Megan and Thomas spend more time together, they become dance partners and begin to fall in love.

Cast
 Shoshana Bush as Megan White
 Damon Wayans Jr. as Thomas Uncles
 Essence Atkins as Charity Uncles
 Affion Crockett as A-Con
 Shawn Wayans as Baby Daddy
 Amy Sedaris as Ms. Cameltoé
 David Alan Grier as Sugar Bear
 Chelsea Makela as Tracy Transfat
 Chris Elliott as Ron White (Megan's Dad)
 Brennan Hillard as Jack
 Lochlyn Munro as The Coach (Jack's Dad)
 Christina Murphy as Nora
 Marlon Wayans as Mr. Moody
 Kim Wayans as Ms. Dontwannabebothered
 Keenen Ivory Wayans as Mr. Stache
 Craig Wayans as Truck
 Ross Thomas as Tyler Gage
 George Gore II as Ray Charles
 Tichina Arnold as Aretha Robinson (Ray's Mamma)
 Lauren Bowles as Glynn White (Megan's Mom)
 Sufe Bradshaw as Keloid
 Andrew McFarlane as D
 Casey Lee as Undercover Cop
 Chaunté Wayans as Free Gas Pedestrian

Release
On the opening weekend (May 22–24), the film ranked at No. 5 in the top 10 with $10,643,536 in 2,450 theaters.

Reception
Rotten Tomatoes, a review aggregator, reports that 18% of 95 surveyed critics gave the film a positive review; the average rating is 3.49/10.  The site's consensus reads: "Dance Flick scores a few laughs thanks to the Wayans brothers' exuberance, but it's ultimately a scattershot collection of gags without much direction." On Metacritic, it got a 40/100 "mixed or average" score based on 17 critic reviews.  Peter Deburge of Variety wrote that it "delivers just enough laughs to justify its existence".

Parodies
 Footloose
 Chappelle's Show (I'm Rick James, Bitch During the Dance Audition to Super Freak)
 Save the Last Dance (characters and main plotline; promotional poster)
 You Got Served (the first battle in the movie/the character of Sugar Bear and the fact that Thomas and A-Con owe him money by the end of the next week or else)
 Stomp the Yard (the head slip at the beginning and last battle)
 Step Up (Nora's auditioning dancers)
 Flashdance (the warm-up)
 Step Up 2: The Streets (last battle)
 Hairspray (Tracy Transfat)
 Dirty Dancing (cut from final print)
 Mamma Mia! (cut from final print, can be briefly seen in international trailer)
 Little Miss Sunshine (Megan's audition to "Super Freak")
 Final Destination 2 (the scene where Megan's mom was in a crash)
 How She Move (cut from final print)
 Showgirls
 Black Snake Moan (the scene where Megan is chained to the radiator and Thomas looks like, and quotes the Samuel L. Jackson character)
 High School Musical (the character of Jack wanting to be a dancer, the name of the high school, and the basketball scene in the gym.)
 Fame (Jack's Flame sequence)
 Honey (mentioned in rant)
 Bring It On
 Center Stage (dance class scene)
 Twilight (the prom scene)
 Roll Bounce (mentioned in rant; last battle scene)
 Notorious
 Superbad (Megan's ID card identifies her as "McLovin")
 Catwoman (the scene when Megan's mom gets run over/hit and run)
 Ray (the blind guy named Ray Charles and his mom)
 Dreamgirls (the "And I Am Telling You My Belly's Growling" song)
 Edward Scissorhands (Edward "Trigger"-hands)
 Final Destination (when Megan's dad shows her room)
 Crash (the car crash)
 America's Best Dance Crew
 Coyote Ugly
 So You Think You Can Dance
 ATL
 Brokeback Mountain (the two cowboys in the gay song)
 Roots (Mr. Moody's film)

References

External links
 
 
 
 
 Shawn and Damien Wayans: The Dance Flick interview with Kam Williams

2009 films
2000s dance films
2000s musical comedy films
2000s parody films
2000s teen comedy films
American dance films
American musical comedy films
American parody films
American teen comedy films
2000s English-language films
African-American comedy films
Films set in Manhattan
Films set in New York City
2000s hip hop films
MTV Films films
Paramount Pictures films
2009 directorial debut films
2009 comedy films
2000s American films